The 1864 Illinois gubernatorial election was the thirteenth election for this office and took place during the American Civil War.  Republican governor Richard Yates did not run for re-election, but was instead elected to serve in the United States Senate.  Major General Richard J. Oglesby resigned his commission to run as the Republican nominee.  Congressman James Carroll Robinson was the Democratic nominee.
At this time in Illinois history, the Lieutenant Governor was elected on a separate ballot from the governor. This would remain the case until the adoption of the 1970 constitution.

Results

References

Illinois
1864
Gubernatorial